Miss Teen USA 2017 was the 35th Miss Teen USA pageant held at the Phoenix Symphony Hall in Phoenix, Arizona on July 29, 2017. Karlie Hay of Texas crowned her successor, Sophia Dominguez-Heithoff of Missouri  at the end of the event. The pageant was hosted by celebrity personal trainer and author Heidi Powell and E! correspondent Erin Lim, while Mexican singer Jorge Blanco performed.

It was the first time the pageant was held in Arizona and the first to broadcast in high dynamic range (HDR) color, virtual reality and on PlayStation consoles.

This was the final year that Miss USA and Miss Teen USA pageants have held separately, due to scheduling changes of the succeeding year's pageant that Dominguez-Heithoff would be the shortest reigning titleholders in the pageant, which held for nine months and 19 days.

Results

Placements

Special Awards

Historical significance 
 Missouri wins competition for the second time.
 Oregon earns the 1st runner-up position for the first time and it reaches the highest position since Tami Farrell won Miss Teen USA 2003. 
 Nevada earns the 2nd runner-up position for the third time. This was last placed in 2004.
 Indiana earns the 3rd runner-up position for the first time and it reaches the highest position since Kelly Lloyd in 1993.
 California earns the 4th runner-up position for the second time. This was last placed in 2005.
 States that placed in semifinals the previous year were California,  Missouri, Nevada, Texas and Vermont.
 California placed for the fifth consecutive year.
 Texas placed for the fourth consecutive year.
 Missouri and Vermont placed for the third consecutive year.
 Nevada placed for the second consecutive year.
 Arizona, New York and Oklahoma last placed in 2015.
 Indiana and West Virginia last placed in 2014.
 Maryland last placed in 2013.
 Utah and Wyoming last placed in 2012.
 Iowa and Oregon last placed in 2003.
 South Carolina breaks an ongoing streak of placements since 2011.
 Tennessee breaks an ongoing streak of placements since 2013.
 Alabama, Louisiana and North Carolina break an ongoing streak of placements since 2015.

Pageant

Selection of contestants
One delegate from the 50 states and the District of Columbia were selected in state pageants held from September 2016 to February 2017.

Preliminary round
Prior to the final competition, the delegates compete in the preliminary competition, which involves private interviews with the judges and a presentation show where they compete in athletic wear and evening gown. It was held on July 28, one day before the finals.

Finals
During the final competition, the top 15 finalists compete in athletic wear, evening gown and in a customized final question round, and the winner is decided by a panel of judges.

Broadcasting
All rounds of the pageant were webcast on the Miss U mobile app, the pageant's Facebook page and as downloadable live events available on the PlayStation Store for PlayStation 4 consoles. The final round was also streamed on Xbox One consoles via Mixer, with support for high dynamic range (HDR) using the HDR10 standard, and on Xbox 360 consoles via Xbox Live.

For the first time, 360-degree broadcasts of the pageant were available for the Google Daydream, PlayStation VR and Samsung Gear VR headsets.

Judges
K. Lee Graham – Miss Teen USA 2014 from South Carolina
Divya Gugnani – entrepreneur and cofounder of Wander Beauty
Kalani Hilliker – dancer, actress, and model
Tamaya Petteway – businesswoman and Senior Vice President of Endemol Shine North America's Brand and Licensing Partnerships Division
Syleste Rodriguez – news anchor

Contestants
Contestant stats provided via the Miss Universe Organization.

Notes

References

External links

 Miss Teen USA official website

2017
Beauty pageants in the United States
2017 beauty pageants
July 2017 events in the United States